Ragazzi del Juke-Box (a.k.a. Juke-Box Kids) is a 1959 Italian "musicarello" film directed (and co-written) by Lucio Fulci and starring Mario Carotenuto, Elke Sommer and Anthony Steffen. Lucio Fulci has a cameo in the film as a festival organizer.

More than for the subject and the script, it deserves to be considered for the cast comprising some of the greatest characters of Italian pop music at the time of the screamers. The film sees the first film success of Adriano Celentano (who the previous year had made a first appearance in I frenetici) and includes for example the version of the band I Campioni of the song considered the first Italian rock'n roll, Ciao ti dirò del 1958 with text by Giorgio Calabrese and music by Gian Franco Reverberi [1] already interpreted by Giorgio Gaber and then by Ricky Gianco.

Plot
Sir Cesari (Mario Carotenuto) runs a record company that promotes the classical music he loves. But when he goes to prison, his attractive young daughter Giulia (Elke Sommer) takes over the company and uses it to promote rock n' roll singers instead.

Cast
 Mario Carotenuto:  Commander Cesari 
 Elke Sommer:  Giulia Cesari 
 Anthony Steffen:  Paolo Macelloni  
 Giacomo Furia:  Gennarino 
 Yvette Masson:  Maria Davanzale 
 Fred Buscaglione and his Asternovas: Fred and his band   
 Adriano Celentano and the Modern Jazz Gang: Adriano and his band
 Betty Curtis: Betty Dorys
 Gianni Meccia: Jimmy
 Tony Dallara: Tony Bellaria
 Mario Ambrosino: il contino
 Giuliano Mancini: Jimmy 
 Karin Well: Girl at club
 Umberto D'Orsi
 Enzo Garinei
 Ornella Vanoni
 Lucio Fulci: Festival organizer

References

External links 
 

1959 films
1950s Italian-language films
Films directed by Lucio Fulci
1959 musical comedy films
Musicarelli
1950s Italian films